Amanayara is a genus of insect in family Gryllidae.

Taxonomy
The Orthoptera Species File database lists the following species:
Amanayara bernardesi Pereira, Sperber & Lhano, 2010
Amanayara helenae Pereira, Sperber & Lhano, 2010
Amanayara jutinga de Mello & Jacomini, 1994
Amanayara piuna de Mello & Jacomini, 1994
Amanayara ribasi Pereira, Sperber & Lhano, 2010

References

Ground crickets